Oecomys trinitatis, also known as the long-furred oecomys, long-furred rice rat, Trinidad arboreal rice rat, or big arboreal rice rat, is a species of rodent in the genus Oecomys of family Cricetidae. As currently constituted, it has a wide distribution in Central America and South America, being found in southern Costa Rica, Panama, Colombia, Venezuela, Trinidad and Tobago, Guyana, Suriname, French Guiana, much of Brazil, eastern Ecuador, and eastern Peru.

References

Oecomys
Mammals of Colombia
Rodents of Central America
Mammals of Trinidad and Tobago
Mammals of the Caribbean
Mammals of Guyana
Mammals of Central America
Mammals of Venezuela
Mammals of Brazil
Mammals of Ecuador
Mammals of Peru
Mammals of Suriname
Mammals of French Guiana
Mammals described in 1893
Taxa named by Joel Asaph Allen
Taxa named by Frank Chapman (ornithologist)